Iona is an unincorporated community in Johnson Township, Knox County, Indiana.

A post office was established at Iona in 1888, and remained in operation until it was discontinued in 1903.

Geography

References

Unincorporated communities in Knox County, Indiana
Unincorporated communities in Indiana